Sõmeru may refer to several places in Estonia:

Sõmeru Parish, municipality in Lääne-Viru County
Sõmeru, small borough in Sõmeru Parish, Lääne-Viru County
Sõmeru, Kiili Parish, village in Kiili Parish, Harju County
Sõmeru, Kose Parish, village in Kose Parish, Harju County
Sõmeru, Järva County, village in Paide Parish, Järva County
Sõmeru, Rapla County, village in Märjamaa Parish, Rapla County